Frontiers may refer to:
 Frontier, areas near or beyond a boundary

Arts and entertainment

Music
 Frontiers (Journey album), 1983
 Frontiers (Jermaine Jackson album), 1978
 Frontiers (Jesse Cook album), 2007
 Frontiers (Psycho le Cemu album), 2003
 "Frontiers", a song by Symphony X from The Odyssey
 Frontiers Records, an Italian record label

Other uses in arts and entertainment
 Frontier(s), a 2007 horror film
 Frontiers (2023 film), a Canadian drama film
 Frontiers (magazine), an LGBT magazine
 Frontiers (1989 TV series), a 1989 British documentary series that aired on the BBC
 Frontiers (1996 TV series), a 1996 British crime drama that aired on ITV

Science and academia

Frontiers in... series of journals
 Frontiers Media, publisher of the Frontiers in... series of 59 journals
 Frontiers in Endocrinology
 Frontiers in Plant Science
 Frontiers in Psychology
 Frontiers in Physics
 Frontiers for Young Minds, not part of the series proper

Publications from Karger Publishers
Frontiers in Diabetes
Frontiers of Gastrointestinal Research
Frontiers of Hormone Research
Frontiers of Matrix Biology
Frontiers of Neurology and Neuroscience
Frontiers of Oral Biology
Frontiers of Oral Physiology
Frontiers of Radiation Therapy and Oncology

Journals published by Higher Education Press
Frontiers of Agricultural Science and Engineering
Frontiers of Architectural Research
Frontiers in Biology
Frontiers of Business Research in China
Frontiers of Chemical Science and Engineering
Frontiers of Computer Science
Frontiers of Earth Science
Frontiers of Economics in China
Frontiers of Education in China
Frontiers in Energy
Frontiers of Engineering Management
Frontiers of Environmental Science & Engineering
Frontiers of History in China
Frontiers of Law in China
Frontiers of Literary Studies in China
Frontiers of Materials Science
Frontiers of Mathematics in China
Frontiers of Mechanical Engineering
Frontiers of Medicine
Frontiers of Optoelectronics
Frontiers of Philosophy in China
Frontiers of Physics
Frontiers of Structural and Civil Engineering, formerly Frontiers of Architecture and Civil Engineering in China
Landscape Architecture Frontiers

Other publications
 Frontiers (PPARC magazine), a scientific magazine published by the Particle Physics and Astronomy Research Council
 Frontiers: The Interdisciplinary Journal of Study Abroad, the official publication of the Forum on Education Abroad
 Frontiers: A Journal of Women Studies, a triannual academic journal on women's studies
 Frontiers in Applied Mathematics, published by SIAM
 Frontiers in Bioscience published by the Frontiers in Bioscience organization
 Frontiers of Biogeography, published by the International Biogeography Society
 Frontiers in Ecology and the Environment, published by the Ecological Society of America 
 Frontiers of Information Technology & Electronic Engineering, published by Springer
 Frontiers of Medical and Biological Engineering, published by Brill
 Frontiers in Neuroendocrinology, published by Elsevier
 Frontiers of Sanitation, published at the Institute of Development Studies
 Frontiers in Zoology, published by BioMed Central
 Frontiers journal series published by the Chinese Chemical Society and the Royal Society of Chemistry

See also
 Frontier (disambiguation)